False Dreams is a Ugandan drama television series that premiered on DStv Uganda's Pearl Magic TV on 2 January 2020. The series stars Stellah Nantumbwe, Housen Mushema, Elizabeth Bwamimpeke and follows a group of friends from university that are struggling to navigate through the challenges in their lives. The series was produced by Phad Mutumba at his Phaz Motion Pictures in Kampala.

Cast
Housen Mushema as Duncan
Joy Agaba as Janet
Stella Nante as Lilian
Derek Bakali as Mark Mangeni
Afexon Audax as Jonathan
Stellah Nantumbwe as Mellisa Nakito
Elizabeth Bwamimpeke as Miriam
Martha Kay

Episodes

Series overview
{| class="wikitable" style="text-align:center"
|-
! style="padding: 0 8px;" colspan="2" rowspan="2"| Season
! style="padding: 0 8px;" rowspan="2"| Episodes
! colspan="2"| Originally aired 
|-
! style="padding: 0 8px;"| First aired
! style="padding: 0 8px;"| Last aired
|-
|style="background: #F9BA00;"|
| 1
| 11
| style="padding:0 8px;"| 
| style="padding:0 8px;"| 
|-
|style="background: #100000;"|
| 2
| 11
| style="padding:0 8px;"| 
| style="padding:0 8px;"| TBA
|-  
|}

References

2020 Ugandan television series debuts
Ugandan drama television series
Pearl Magic original programming